The Men's -73 kg competition at the 2010 World Judo Championships was held at 11 September at the Yoyogi National Gymnasium in Tokyo, Japan. 82 competitors contested for the medals, being split in 4 Pools where the winner advanced to the medal round.

Pool A
Last 32 fights:
 Wang Ki-Chun 101 vs.  Künter Rothberg 000
 Krzysztof Wiłkomirski 100 vs.  Edson Madeira 000
 Kiyoshi Uematsu 001 vs.  David Papaux 000
 Nicholas Tritton 000 vs.  Nicholas Delpopolo 110
 Kristjan Jonsson 100 vs.  Samuela Mateiyalona 000

Pool B
Last 32 fights:
 Ali Maloumat 021 vs.  Mirali Sharipov 000
 Jean Bottieau 020 vs.  Abner Waterhouse 000
 Yasuhiro Awano 101 vs.  Batradz Kaytmazov 000
 Dmytro Sheretov 000 vs.  Sandor Taraba 100
 Emmanuel Nartey 110 vs.  Khalifa Al Qubaisi 000

Pool C
Last 32 fights:
 Bang Gui-Man 102 vs.  Rinat Ibragimov 000
 Volodymyr Soroka 100 vs.  Daniel Williams 000
 Jia Yitao 000 vs.  Hussein Hafiz 100
 Nyam Sainjargal 100 vs.  Nikola Pejic 000

Pool D
Last 32 fights:
 Dirk Van Tichelt 000 vs.  Tomasz Adamiec 100
 Sayed Hussaini 000 vs.  Renat Mirzaliyev 100
 Arslan Nurmuhammedov 000 vs.  Michael Eldred 100
Fatos Tabaku 000 vs.  Navruz Jurakobilov 101

Repechage

Finals

References

 Results

External links
 
 Official Site 

M73
World Judo Championships Men's Lightweight